Kalnovka is a rural locality (a selo) in Vyazovsky Selsoviet, Chernoyarsky District, Astrakhan Oblast, Russia. The population was 102 as of 2010. There are 2 streets.

Geography 
Kalnovka is located on the Podgornoye Lake, 54 km northwest of Chyorny Yar (the district's administrative centre) by road. Vyazovka is the nearest rural locality.

References 

Rural localities in Chernoyarsky District